The Leopold Football Netball Club, nicknamed the Lions, is an Australian rules football and netball club based in Leopold, Victoria. The club teams currently compete in the regional Geelong Football Netball League. They play their home games at Leopold Memorial Park.

History
Originally a team from Leopold played in local competitions from 1897 to 1922.

In 1923 they disbanded.

In 1955 they reformed and entered into the Geelong & District Football League, Jarman Cup  division. In 1963 they lost the Grand Final, both Grand Finalists were promoted to the Woolworths Cup. In 1964 they made the Woolworth Cup Grand Final but lost by a point.

In 1965 the transferred into the Polwarth Football League. While in this league moves were made for a Bellarine Peninsula based football competition. In 1971 they were one of the founding clubs of the Bellarine Football League. Finally in 1992 Leopold was admitted into the Geelong Football League, where has remained up to present days.

VFL/AFL players 

 David Loats – 
 Ben Graham – 
 Tony Brown – 
 Tim Boyle – 
 Clint Bartram – 
 Mario Bortolotto – , 
 Luke Dahlhaus – 
 Tom Ruggles - 
Jed Bews - Geelong
Craig Dowsett. -  Geelong

Bibliography
 Cat Country – History of Football in the Geelong Region, John Stoward,

References

External links
 Official website

Geelong Football League clubs
1955 establishments in Australia
Geelong & District Football League clubs
Sports clubs established in 1955
Australian rules football clubs established in 1955
Netball teams in Victoria (Australia)